James Prescott (2 November 1930 – 14 February 2011) was an English professional footballer who played as an inside forward.

Career
Born in Lowton, Prescott played for Lowton St. Mary's, Southport, York City and Wigan Athletic. He played 98 times for the Latics in the Lancashire Combination, scoring 36 goals, and scored a further three goals in 37 appearances in the Cheshire League during his final season at the club.

References

1930 births
2011 deaths
English footballers
Association football forwards
Southport F.C. players
York City F.C. players
Wigan Athletic F.C. players
English Football League players